Tachornis is a genus of swift in the family Apodidae. It contains the following species:
 Pygmy palm swift (Tachornis furcata)
 Fork-tailed palm swift (Tachornis squamata)
 Antillean palm swift (Tachornis phoenicobia)
 Tachornis uranoceles (fossil; Late Pleistocene of Puerto Rico)

 
Bird genera
Taxa named by Philip Henry Gosse
Taxonomy articles created by Polbot